Mogul is a global diversity recruitment company, founded by American entrepreneurs Tiffany Pham and David Pham.

The company is backed by investors SoftBank Group and Hearst corporation, and provides diversity recruitment software and diverse executive and board search services to Fortune 1000 clients including Chanel, UBS, Bristol Myers Squibb, Intuit, EBay, Nike, Inc., and Amazon (company).

Awards and recognition 
In 2014, Mogul was the winner of the Cadillac "IVY Innovator Award.” Mogul was also honored by the United Nations, Forbes, Inc. (magazine), and Entrepreneur (magazine).

In 2016, Mogul launched the #IAmAMogul campaign featuring Chelsea Clinton and Mayor of Paris Anne Hidalgo to "inspire all women to realize that they too can be moguls, and that they have the power to shape the world through their voices and actions."

In 2020, Mogul became the subject of a case study by Harvard Business School called "Redefining Mogul."

References

External links 
 Mogul

Social media